The 2017 Porsche Império GT3 Cup Challenge Brasil is the first one-make Porsche racing championship in South America for 911 GT3 Cup cars and this was the thirteenth season. It started on March 18 with a Sprint race in Curitiba and finished on December 2 with an Endurance race in São Paulo. It was first held in 2005 and follows the same formula basis used in the Porsche Supercup and Porsche Carrera Cup championships held around the world.

Drivers
All cars are overseen by the Dener Motorsport team. Cup, that uses the same cars of the European series; Porsche 911 GT3 Cup (Type 991)  and Challenge, that uses Porsche 911 GT3 Cup (Type 997) cars with a less-powerful engine.

Race Calendar and Results

Races Cup Sprint
All races are scheduled to be held in Brazil and Argentina.

Races Challenge Sprint
All races are scheduled to be held in Brazil and Argentina.

Endurance Series
All races are scheduled to be held in Brazil.

Notes

Drivers' Championship

Points are awarded for each race at an event to the driver/s of a car that completed at least 70% of the race distance and was running at the completion of the race. The sprint races has the partially top 6 or 10 grid depending on a draw. Only the best 11 results in cup class counts toward the championship, while in challenge class only the best 5 results.

Cup

Challenge

Endurance

Footnotes

External links
 
 Porsche GT3 Cup Brazil at Driver Database

Porsche GT3 Cup Brasil
Porsche GT3 Cup Brasil seasons